Abdullah Çevrim (20 July 1941 – 19 February 2019) was a Turkish footballer who played as a forward for Gençlerbirliği, Fenerbahçe, MKE Ankaragücü and Gaziantepspor.

He graduated in Kuleli Military High School where he played in sports, he started his football career with Harbiye SK (Militarty Sport Club) and then transferred to Gençlerbirliği where he scored 41 goals in 138 matches between 1961 and 1966. 

He transferred to Fenerbahçe SK and played there four years between 1966 and 1970. He scored 23 goals in 106 matches and won the 1967–8 and 1969–70 Turkish League titles also won 1966-67 Balkan Cup. He played six times for the Turkey national team.

He transferred to MKE Ankaragücü and played with them between 1970 and 1972 and won the Turkish Cup with them in the 1971–72 season.

He died in Fethiye on 19 February 2019 of a heart attack.

References

External links
 

1941 births
2019 deaths
Turkish footballers
Association football forwards
Turkey international footballers
Fenerbahçe S.K. footballers
Kuleli Military High School alumni